DeHaat is an Agritech company {headquartered in Patna, that offers end-to-end agricultural services to the Indian farmers.

History
DeHaat was founded in 2012 by Shashank Kumar, an IIT Delhi alumnus, Shyam Sundar, IIT Kharagpur and IIM Ahmedabad alumnus, NIT Jamshedpur alumnus Amrendra Singh, IIT Dhanbad alumni Adarsh Srivastava and Abhishek Dokania. DeHaat provides agricultural services to farmers, including distribution of seeds, pesticides, fertilizers, farm machinery, cattle feed and all agriculture allied products, farm advisory, financial services and market linkages to sell farm produce.

Acquisitions
In January 2021 DeHaat acquired FarmGuide, a business-to-business (B2B) Software as a Service (SaaS) platform.

In January 2022 DeHaat acruired agri-input marketplace startup Helicrofter to expand its Presence in Maharashtra and other parts of western India.

To strengthen its foothold in the global food supply chain, DeHaat in April 2022 acquired food tech company, Y-Cook India Pvt. Ltd.

Business structure
DeHaat has established linkages with around 7 lakh smallholder farmers in Bihar, Jharkhand, West Bengal, Odisha, Uttar Pradesh, Rajasthan and Madhya Pradesh through its 4,000 Dehaat centres, which are run via the franchise model.
Farmers linked to DeHaat get access to agricultural input products such as seed, fertilizers and pesticides, along with an artificial intelligence (AI)-based customized crop advisory on pest and disease management, delivered via a mobile app and call centres.

References

External links
 Official website
Companies based in Bihar
Companies based in Patna